The Company of Women may refer to:

 The Company of Women (Singh novel), a 1999 novel by Indian author Khushwant Singh
 The Company of Women (Gordon novel), a 1981 novel by Irish-American author Mary Gordon